Harry George Agombar (born 12 July 1992) is an English footballer who plays as a midfielder for Isthmian League Division One North club Bowers & Pitsea.

Playing career
Agombar arrived at Swindon Town in the summer of 2013 as a trialist before signing a two-year deal. The midfielder made his professional football debut on the final day of the League One regular season against Leyton Orient.

Career statistics

Club

References

External links

1992 births
Living people
Footballers from Stepney
English footballers
Association football forwards
Grays Athletic F.C. players
Barnet F.C. players
Macclesfield Town F.C. players
Histon F.C. players
Floriana F.C. players
Swindon Town F.C. players
Hereford United F.C. players
Thurrock F.C. players
Hornchurch F.C. players
Bowers & Pitsea F.C. players
English Football League players
National League (English football) players
Isthmian League players
Maltese Premier League players